Pool B of the 2019 Fed Cup Asia/Oceania Zone Group I was one of two pools in the Asia/Oceania zone of the 2019 Fed Cup. Four teams competed in a round robin competition, with the top team and the bottom team proceeding to their respective sections of the play-offs: the top team played for advancement to the World Group II Play-offs, while the bottom team faced potential relegation to Group II.

Standings 

Standings are determined by: 1. number of wins; 2. number of matches; 3. in two-team ties, head-to-head records; 4. in three-team ties, (a) percentage of sets won (head-to-head records if two teams remain tied), then (b) percentage of games won (head-to-head records if two teams remain tied), then (c) Fed Cup rankings.

Round-robin

China vs. Pacific Oceania

South Korea vs. Indonesia

China vs. South Korea

Indonesia vs. Pacific Oceania

China vs. Indonesia

South Korea vs. Pacific Oceania

References

External links 
 Fed Cup website

2019 Fed Cup Asia/Oceania Zone